Samuel Keefa Kamya Ssemakula was a Ugandan Anglican bishop who served as the Diocesan of West Buganda.

References

21st-century Anglican bishops in Uganda
Uganda Christian University alumni
Anglican bishops of West Buganda